Luis Guisao is a Marseille-based singer who grew up in St Henri, a village neighborhood of mainly Andalusian gypsies near L'Estaque and Marseille. Self-trained guitar and piano player, he composed songs for a 6-member music formation he formed called Salsa Flamenca, when he was just 16, specializing in Latin and flamenco tunes.

Discography
Featured in singles

References

External links
Luis Guisao Facebook Page

French male singers
Living people
Musicians from Marseille
Year of birth missing (living people)